General elections were held in the Territory of Curaçao on 20 December 1937. Ten of the fifteen seats in the Estates of Curaçao were elected, with the remaining five appointed by the governor G.J.J. Wouters. The ten elected seats consisted of six for Curaçao, two for Aruba, one for Bonaire and one for the SSS Islands

From 1833 there was a Colonial Council ('Koloniale Raad') whose members were not elected. The council was replaced in April 1938 by the Estates of Curaçao. From a population of 90,870 (December 1936) only 2,754 men, about 3% of the population, were entitled to vote in the elections.

The new session of the Estates started on the first Tuesday of April 1938.

Curaçao 
Population: 58,233 (31 December 1936)
Entitled to vote: 2,030
Valid votes: 1,549
Invalide votes: 116

Lists of candidates: 
 Curaçaoan Roman Catholic Party (CRKP)
 Curaçaoan Political Union (CPU)
 CSM pilots

Aruba 
Population: 21,638 (31 December 1936)
Entitled to vote: 553
Valid votes: 381

Bonaire 
Population: 5,827 (31 December 1936)
Entitled to vote: 31

 John Aniceto de Jongh (only candidate and therefore automatically elected)

SSS Islands 
Entitled to vote: 140
Valid votes: 107

Appointed by the governor 
 Frederik Philip Bichon van IJsselmonde
 Salomon Alfred Senior
 José Maria Pedro Kroon
 John Horris Sprockel
 Carel Nicolaas Winkel

In 1940 Bichon van IJsselmonde was succeeded by Frederik Augustus Vromans.

Aftermath 
Although a vast majority of the population was catholic, in the last Colonial Council only 4 of the 13 members were catholic. In the new Estates 8 out of the 15 members were catholic.

Sprockel did not receive enough votes to be elected but was soon after the elections appointed by the governor to be a member of the Estates. Originally Jossy Cohen Henriquez, speaker of the Colonial Council, was one of the members of Estates who were appointed by the governor. After S.M.L. Maduro died Cohen Henriquez succeeded him as member of the 'Raad van Bestuur' so he could no longer become a member of the Estates. A few days before the Estates started in April 1938 the governor appointed Senior instead of Cohen Henriquez. Wouters also decided Sprockel was the speaker of the parliament and Winkel the deputy speaker.

References 
 Amigoe di Curaçao, 22 December 1937
 Amigoe di Curaçao, 5 January 1938
 Amigoe di Curaçao, 18 November 1941

Elections in the Netherlands Antilles
Curacao